The Beautiful Girl may refer to:

The Beautiful Girl (1923 film), a 1923 German silent film
The Beautiful Girl (1969 film), a 1969 Soviet drama film

See also
The Beautiful Girls, an Australian band
Beautiful Girl (disambiguation)